Maksim Sergeyevich Shiryayev (born 13 July 1995) is a Russian football player. He plays for the FC Rubin Kazan.

Club career
He made his debut in the Russian Professional Football League for FC Spartak Kostroma on 20 July 2015 in a game against FC Domodedovo Moscow.

He made his Russian Football National League debut for FC Neftekhimik Nizhnekamsk on 7 July 2019 in a game against FC Mordovia Saransk.

In February 2023, «Rubin» and «Neftekhimik» agreed on the transfer of defender Maxim Shiryaev.

References

External links
 Profile by Russian Professional Football League
 

1995 births
Footballers from Moscow
Living people
Russian footballers
Association football defenders
FC Spartak Kostroma players
FC Olimp-Dolgoprudny players
FK Jelgava players
FC Neftekhimik Nizhnekamsk players
FC Rubin Kazan players
Russian First League players
Russian Second League players
Latvian Higher League players
Russian expatriate footballers
Expatriate footballers in Latvia
Russian expatriate sportspeople in Latvia